Karevo (Russian: Карево)  is a rural locality (a village) in Kunyinsky District, Pskov Oblast, Russia. Included as a part of  Zhizhitsk Volost.

Geography 
Located 5 km west from the center of Volost, village Zhizhitsa, on a North-Western shore of Kadosno lake.

Population 
In 2001, the population numbered 31 people.

History 

Karevo is a birthplace of great Russian composer Modest Mussorgsky. The village Naumovo is a place of his museum-estate.

References 

Rural localities in Pskov Oblast